Oracle Secure Global Desktop (SGD) software provides secure access to both published applications and published desktops running on Microsoft Windows, Unix, mainframe and IBM i systems via a variety of clients ranging from fat PCs to thin clients such as Sun Rays.

History

In 1993 the Santa Cruz Operation (SCO, later Tarantella, Inc.) acquired IXI Limited, a software company in Cambridge, UK, best known for its X.desktop product. In 1994 it then bought Visionware, of Leeds, UK, developers of XVision. In 1995 the development teams from IXI and Visionware were combined to form IXI Visionware, later the Client Integration Division of SCO.

A development team within this division began work in 1996 on a project codenamed Tarantella. The goal of this project was "any application, any client, anywhere": access to applications of any type (hosted on back-end servers) from any client device that supported a Java-enabled web browser. The project codename stuck: it became the final product name. The first public release of Tarantella software was in November 1997. Later version 1.x releases supported more application types (such as Microsoft Windows applications) and client types (including Native Clients to remove the dependency on Java support), and added scalability and security features to better support larger enterprises and secure application access over the Internet.

The product was renamed Tarantella Enterprise II in late 1999, with a cut-down Tarantella Express product available on Linux systems. This renaming was a simple rebrand of the then-current 1.x release: no version 2.x software was released.

In November 2000 version 3.0 of the product was released, including a major rewrite of much server-side code in the Java language. The product was rebranded as Tarantella Enterprise 3, with releases for Linux and major UNIX systems. Further 3.x releases followed in subsequent years, adding more integration features in competition with similar software from Citrix.

Sun Microsystems acquired Tarantella, Inc. in July 2005. The product underwent massive development in the following years.  As of April 2021, the current version is Oracle Secure Global Desktop 5.6.535.

Overview

SGD is considered by industry insiders to be a competitor to Citrix's products for remote application delivery. 

A large range of client devices can connect to a Secure Global Desktop Server, including Microsoft Windows PCs, Solaris desktops, Apple Macintoshes, Linux PCs, thin clients such as those from Sun and Wyse, and mobile devices. The client requires only a web browser with a Java Runtime Environment installed.

A client device connects to the Secure Global Desktop Server either via a supported Java-enabled browser or via Native Client software (this "native client" can be downloaded from a SGD installation's login page, i.e. instead of logging in and letting the Java applet handle the connection automatically for you, you could instead do it manually by downloading this "native client" from the SGD main login page, install it locally, and then launch it and connect via this). When you connect via a browser the first time as a client, the SGD client (the client-side of the aforementioned Java component) is downloaded so you can then SSL-encrypt your connection. The system officially supports Mozilla Firefox, Internet Explorer, and Safari, but other browsers might work too for as long as they have access to a working Java-plugin. The latest Java Runtime Environment is recommended but at least version 1.5 is required.

The Desktop Client connects to the Secure Global Desktop Server via the Adaptive Internet Protocol (AIP). AIP is bandwidth- and latency-aware and can adjust compression and performance dynamically on links as diverse as a 56K modem or a 100Mb LAN.

Session Resumability and Mobility is a feature allowing remote access to desktop applications from essentially any Java-enabled browser in the world. This makes it possible to run applications in one's office, then go to another location such as a customer site or one's home and transfer your existing desktop session to a computer there.

Centralisation is an important feature for organizations concerned with secure data being stored on remote devices such as notebook computers, and the associated risk for theft of the device and its data. Applications accessed via SGD run in the centralised server room, meaning that all data is backed up and secured via the normal datacenter practices of the organization. There is a potential for increased performance and efficiency, since the actual computation is performed on larger systems with more resources; centralisation also makes resources considerably easier to manage.

Applications can be assigned to users or groups of users using the Object Manager which can automatically present new applications to users dynamically without them needing to log out. Profiles can be created to group similar types of users; these profiles control the applications that a logged-in user is allowed to use. When a new application or an upgrade to an existing application is required, an administrator can just push these changes out to the users. This simplifies Desktop SOE migrations.

SGD's password-caching feature, authentication tokens, and ability to integrate with Active Directory and LDAP gives it the ability to easily set up single sign-on to applications: a user logs into SGD once, and then can run applications without having to perform an additional login—even if there are usernames and passwords used for the different back-end applications.

With the same SGD infrastructure one can host an organisation's internal desktop applications, but also be able to access desktop applications remotely without the need for expensive VPN solutions. The Firewall Traversal Feature makes it possible to put an application server in an organisation's DMZ with only port 443 (HTTPS) accessible from the outside world. An SGD server can be accessed via HTTP or HTTPS.

SGD also integrates with the Sun Java System Portal Server making it possible to deliver desktop applications via a Secure Portal using a Portlet, including the ability to mail, calendar and other Portal features.

Sun Java System Identity Manager can also manage all user accounts and passwords via one webform, including integration of LDAP, Active Directory, Oracle or other commercial or home-grown access control repositories.

Features

Since version 4.5, SGD provides SGD Gateway. This allows clients to access the infrastructure in a different physical network. The SGD Gateway splits the traffic.
SGD integration into the GNOME Launch Menu and Windows clients' Start Menu; clients can connect to an SGD server when they log into their client automatically, without the need to open up a browser. Desktop icons can be created to start applications via SGD without the user being aware of SGD's presence.
Significantly improved bandwidth utilization and screen rendering, making it considerably faster than the previous version. The screen rendering engine has been rewritten from scratch to be made more bandwidth aware and efficient and also to increase rendering performance of the desktop applications. Sun reports 30% faster screen rendering and 80% improvement of bandwidth efficiency.
LDAP and Active Directory supported as login authority sources, multiple LDAP/ADs can be configured
Windows support 
Support for Client Drive Mapping and Local Printer Mapping
Support for serial port forwarding
Oracle Secure Global Desktop Software runs on Solaris 10 (SPARC and x86), Solaris 9 and 8 (SPARC only), Red Hat Enterprise Linux 5 (x86 32-bit). Oracle Enterprise Linux.

The November 2007 release of version 4.4 introduced a web-based management console that replaced the Java-based Object Manager and Array Manager tools that were first introduced in version 3.0.

On April 30, 2013, Oracle released version 5.0 which used HTML5 to provide remote access to applications, especially for mobile devices such as the Apple iPad.

See also
Comparison of remote desktop software
Web desktop

References

External links

Oracle (Sun)

Documentation for Secure Global Desktop 5.6
Oracle Secure Global Desktop Product Page and the list of  requirements for 4.62 
Secure Global Desktop Product Page and the list of  requirements for 4.4 
Documentation for Secure Global Desktop 4.4 
Download a free 30 Day evaluation copy of Secure Global Desktop
Live US demo site (Requires Java enabled browser)

ISV for SGD
amitego - Visulox - Access Control, Cooperation,Recording
CoreNetworks - UMMS - Monitoring SSH Sessions

Mailing lists and forums

Sun's Secure Global Desktop forum
SGD-Users mailing list and web site

Whitepapers and additional information

Sun Secure Global Desktop Overview Whitepaper 
Sun Desktop Virtualisation Blueprint

Related products

Sun Desktop Infrastructure Solution
Sun Identity Management Solution

Sun Microsystems software